Samyang Sageori Station is a station on the Ui LRT located in Mia-dong, Gangbuk-gu, Seoul. It opened on the 2 September 2017.

References

Seoul Metropolitan Subway stations
Railway stations opened in 2017
Metro stations in Gangbuk District